Witiyana Marika is an Aboriginal Australian musician, filmmaker, and elder, known for being a founding member of the band Yothu Yindi and producer of the film High Ground.

Background
Marika was born into the Rirratjingu clan of the Yolngu people of Arnhem Land, Northern Territory of Australia, and raised in Yirrkala.

He a member of the Marika family, and is also a son by lore of the actor David Gulpilil (who died in 2021). His mother was noted artist Ms. D. (Djerrkngu) Eunice Yunupingu (1945–2022). She won the 2022 NATSIAA Telstra Bark Painting Award.

Music career
Marika was in the original line-up of Yothu Yindi when they formed in 1986. He sang in traditional style, singing clan songs of the Yolngu people known as manikay, played bilma clapsticks, and danced.

In 2017, along with fellow  longtime members Malngay Yunupingu and Stuart Kellaway and several new musicians, including his son Yirrmal, he played in Yothu Yindi & The Treaty Project,  with the newly-formed band performing live across Australia into 2019.

Film
Marika played the role of the grandfather as well as being co-producer and senior cultural advisor to the film High Ground, which took around 20 years to make and is based on true events. The film was directed by Stephen Maxwell Johnson, who is a friend of Marika since they met in 1989 and who had made the music video for the Yothu Yind's second single, "Djäpana", which won an ARIA award. Taking part in the project was important to Marika, as he is passionate about the necessity to educate broader Australia about past history of massacres and colonial violence. As a teenager, as part of a ceremony undertaken with his grandfather on their homeland Gäṉgän (Gan Gan), he was taught about the massacre of over 100 people of his  grandmother’s clan, Dhalwaŋu. He had further researched the details of the massacre with his friend and cousin Dr M. Yunupingu, who shared the same grandmother. Two men survived the massacre by hiding in the water and using rushes to breathe through, a trick used by a little boy in the film.

Marika said the film was taking his people's story to the world, in the same way that Yothu Yindi took their music to the world. He played an essential role in navigating relations between the mostly white ("balanda") filmmakers and the traditional owners of Cannon Hill, Gunbalanya and Gunlom, where filming took place and permissions were needed to access the land.

Other roles

Marika is a senior member (or elder) of the Rirratjingu clan, and a senior ceremonial leader and a teacher of songlines and ceremonies for his clan and community.

He has worked as a co-presenter in cross-cultural education, delivering seminars to businesses and academia. He was formerly vice chair of the Aboriginal Resource Development Services (ARDS) and chair of Buku-Larrngay Mulka Arts Centre Committee and Dhimurru Land Management. He is a director of Rirratjingu Mining Pty Ltd and Rirratjingu Investments Pty Ltd.

In 2021 he directed the Yarrapay Festival at Buku-Larrngay, where he played with Yothu Yindi.

Personal life and family
Marika has two wives (as of 2014), as is customary among Yolngu people, in order to form larger clans and stronger families. Marika says that the women are treated equally, and there are many benefits to growing up in a large extended family.

The blues singer Yirrmal is Marika's son.

References

External links

 (29 April 2019) "Filmed live across Australia and New Zealand, between November 2017 and March 2019."

21st-century Australian singers
21st-century Australian male singers
Indigenous Australian musicians
Living people
Year of birth missing (living people)